Cash is a 2021 Indian comedy drama film directed by Rishab Seth and produced by Vishesh Bhatt.

Cast 
The main cast of the film are :-
 Kavin Dave
 Gulshan Grover
 Swanand Kirkire

Critical reception and reviews 
Indo-Asian News Service rated 3.5 out of 5 ratings, Ronak Kotecha of The Times of India rated 3 out of 5 ratings and Ranpreet Kaur of Pinkvilla, rated 2 out of 5 ratings.

References 

2021 films
Indian comedy-drama films